Events from the year 1920 in Denmark.

Incumbents
 Monarch – Christian X
 Prime minister – Carl Theodor Zahle (until 30 March), Otto Liebe (until 5 April), Michael Pedersen Friis (until 5 May), Niels Neergaard

Events

 29 March – Christian X dismisses the elected government, a reserve power he had under the Danish Constitution, giving rise to the constitutional crisis known as the Easter Crisis.
 4 April – The Easter Crisis ends with Christian X's dismissal of the Cabinet of Liebe.
 26 September  The 50th birthday of Christian X is celebrated.

Sports

Date unknown
 B 1903 wins its first Danish football championship by defeating B 1901 20 in the final of the 1919–20 Danish National Football Tournament.

Births
 26 February – Hilmar Baunsgaard, politician, former Danish prime minister (died 1989)
 16 April – Prince George Valdemar of Denmark (died 1986)
 18 June – Grete Jalk, furniture designer (died 2006)
 28 August – Keld Helmer-Petersen, photographer (died 2013)
 6 November  Dagmar Andreasen, businesswoman (died 2006)
 6 December  Mette Koefoed Bjørnsen, author, conciliator and economist (died 2008)

Deaths
 3 March – Theodor Philipsen, painter (born 1840)
 15 April – Hans Peter Johan Lyngbye (born 1834)
 27 June – Hack Kampmann, architect (born 1856)
 7 March  Sophus Christopher Hauberg, industrialist (born 1848)

References

 
Denmark
Years of the 20th century in Denmark
1920s in Denmark